Artyom Viktorovich Chelyadinsky (born 29 December 1977 in Minsk) is a Belarusian former professional footballer and Belarus international.

Early life
Because of his father, Chelyadinsky took up hockey at an early age. However, after getting meningitis, he started playing football instead.

Career
After spending five years with Metalurh Zaporizhya, Chelyadinsky left for Tobol Kostanay in Kazakhstan.

Honours
Torpedo-BelAZ Zhodino
Belarusian Cup winner: 2015–16

References

External links
 
 
 
 

1977 births
Living people
Footballers from Minsk
Belarusian footballers
Association football defenders
Belarus international footballers
Belarusian expatriate footballers
Expatriate footballers in Russia
Expatriate footballers in Ukraine
Belarusian expatriate sportspeople in Ukraine
Expatriate footballers in Kazakhstan
Belarusian expatriate sportspeople in Kazakhstan
Russian Premier League players
Ukrainian Premier League players
FC Dinamo-Juni Minsk players
FC Dinamo Minsk players
FC Sokol Saratov players
FC Metalurh Zaporizhzhia players
FC Tobol players
FC Naftan Novopolotsk players
FC Shakhtyor Soligorsk players
FC Torpedo-BelAZ Zhodino players
FC Krumkachy Minsk players
Belarusian football managers
FC Dinamo Minsk managers